God zij met ons is a proverb phrase written on Dutch coins. This caption was formerly written on the edge of the guilder, rijksdaalder (two and a half guilder), five guilders, ten guilders and twenty-five guilders and today on 2-euro Dutch coins.

This shortened text expands into its Latin origin "Si Deus nobiscum quis contra nos" (If God is with us, who shall be against us?). This biblical motto was used in the Eighty Years' War and taken over by the Dutch Republic for use on its coins.

See also 

 In God We Trust
 So help me God
 Gott mit uns
 Dutch Royal Family
 Religion in the Netherlands

References 

Christianity in the Netherlands
Coins of the Netherlands
Dutch words and phrases
Economic history of the Dutch Republic
Quotations from religion